Alice Woodroffe married name Alice Teague (1904-date of death unknown) was an English international badminton player.

Badminton career
Alice born in 1904  was a winner of the All England Open Badminton Championships. She won the women's 1933 All England Badminton Championships singles.

Woodroffe also won the 1932 Welsh International, the 1933 Scottish Open. She married Robert Teague in 1933 and later competed as Alice Teague, where she reached the final of the 1935 All England Badminton Championships singles final and won the 1935 Irish Open in women's singles.

References

English female badminton players
1904 births
Year of death missing